Ádám Borics (born July 7, 1993) is a Hungarian mixed martial artist who competes in the Featherweight division of Bellator MMA. As of October 4, 2022, he is #1 in the Bellator Featherweight Rankings.

Early life 
Ádám Borics was born in Eger on 7 July 1993. He was raised in a village called Sirok. He started his studies there and spent his free time working out and playing football.  At the age of 16 he started training Muay Thai with one of his friends and at the age of 17 he took part in his very first MMA training and fell in love with the sport.

He was admitted to the University of Physical Education, but he decided to focus his financial and physical resources on sports, so he stopped his studies and took up a job in addition to training. At first, he worked as a masseuse and led training sessions himself.

Mixed martial arts career

Amateur career 
During secondary school Borics took part in numerous Kempo and amateur MMA fights to develop. When he finished his studied, he moved to Eger for better possibilities. Since he was in need of money to pay his trainings, he started teaching MMA and gave massages too.

Professional career 
Borics made his debut at the 5th event of HFC (Hungarian Fight Championship) on 1 August  2014. His opponent was Dániel Hajzer, who got submitted via heel hook shortly after 1 minute.

On 11 October, he faced József Tárnai on HFC 6. Ádám won by unanimous decision. He also faced Ádám Németh the same night, whom he defeated in the 2nd round with by knockout.

In his fourth match, Ádám fought for the HFC 65 kg (143 pound) belt against Benjámin Molnár. The match didn't go as planned, as in the middle of the 4th round Molnar was disqualified for using an illegal slam, so "The Kid" won the first belt on 15 November 2014, at the age of 21.

Borics' first non-Hungarian bout took place in Sarajevo at FFC 7, in featherweight. The Hungarian beat Croatia's Marko Burušić in March 2015.

In his next match, on 9 May 2015, he defended his HFC belt against Jaroslav Jarim on HFC 9. He defeated his Czech opponent with a Triangle choke at the end of the first round.

On HFC 10, he defeated Benjámin Molnár, against whom Borics had won his belt. This was Ádám's last match at the Hungarian organization, from which he left with a record of 6-0 at the end of 2015, after defending his title twice.

In his 8th professional bout, Borics was fighting again in the Final Fight Championship. At FFC 20, Matija Blažičević, a Croatian martial artist. Borics won via split decision.

FFC 23 was held in Vienna on April 18, 2016, where Borics fought against Manuel Bilić. He won via triangle choke.

Bellator 
In early 2017, Borics travelled to America for 3 weeks to a training camp.  He joined the Hard Knocks 365 team (Sanford MMA since 2019) for a few weeks.

Bellator 177 was held 14 April 2017, which was also the first event to be held in Hungary. They gave The Kid a chance to fight against Anthony Taylor. Borics defeated his opponent via rear-naked choke, earning him the 10th win of his career, rewarding him a contract with the Bellator MMA organization for 4 matches.

Borics moved to the United States with his wife, but he had to wait almost an entire year for his next bout, because Ádi's hand was fractured 2 weeks after moving. On 6 April 2018, he returned into the cage again in Budapest at Bellator 196 and knocked out Teodor Nikolov in the 2nd round with his signature flying knee in front of his home audience.

Next time Borics fought Josenaldo Silva, on 21 September 2018 at Bellator 205.  Borics submitted Silva in the third round.

Next time he faced Aaron Pico on Bellator 222, on 14 June 2019. Ádám won by TKO via flying knee in the Madison Square Garden.  After his first 4 fights in Bellator, the Borics had 4 victories, and finished all of them. With that, he also earned a new contract.

Bellator featherweight tournament 
Borics was selected as one of the 16 martial artists to take part in the Bellator Featherweight Tournament.

In the first round of the tournament, Borics got former champion Pat Curran as his opponent. The fight was held on 7 September 2019 on Bellator 226. Borics won by TKO. The victory allowed him to advance to the quarterfinals of the tournament.

In the quarter-finals, Borics took on former former bantamweight Bellator champion Darrion Caldwell. The fight took place on 25 January 2020 on Bellator 238. In first round, Caldwell submitted Ádám with a rear-naked choke. This was the Hungarian's first defeat in martial arts.

Catchweight 
Borics had his next two bouts in catchweight, 150 pounds. Borics faced Mike Hamell on 7 August 2020 on Bellator 243. Hamel couldn't make weight at weigh-ins. Borics won by split decision.

His next opponent was Erick Sánchez. Borics won by unanimous decision on 19 October 2020, on Bellator 250.

Return to featherweight 
On April 9, 2021 at Bellator 256, Borics took on Jeremy Kennedy.  Borics defeated Kennedy by unanimous decision.

Borics was scheduled to face Jay-Jay Wilson for the #1 contender status on August 20, 2021 at Bellator 265. However, at the weigh-ins, Wilson came in at 150.4 pounds, missing weight by 4.4 pounds. As a result, the fight has been scrapped and Borics was paid his show money.

Borics headlined against Mads Burnell on March 12, 2022 at Bellator 276. He won the bout via unanimous decision, in what many consider to be one of the most entertaining matches of the year.

Borics challenged for the Bellator Featherweight Championship against reigning champ Patrício Pitbull on October 1, 2022 at Bellator 286. He lost the bout via unanimous decision.

Personal life 
Ádám Borics lives with his wife, Zsófia Perge in Pompano Beach, Florida, United States. They married in 2017 before moving to the US. Ádám has a brother.

Championships and accomplishments 
Hungarian Fight Championship
HFC Featherweight Championship (one time)
Two successful title defenses

Mixed martial arts record 

|-
|Loss
|align=center|18–2
|Patrício Pitbull
|Decision (unanimous)
|Bellator 286
|
|align=center|5
|align=center|5:00
|Long Beach, California, United States
|
|-
|Win
|align=center|18–1
|Mads Burnell
|Decision (unanimous)
|Bellator 276
|
|align=center| 5
|align=center| 5:00
|St. Louis, Missouri, United States
|
|-
|Win
|align=center|17–1
|Jeremy Kennedy
|Decision (unanimous)
|Bellator 256
|
|align=center|3
|align=center|5:00
|Uncasville, Connecticut, United States
|
|- 
| Win
|align=center| 16–1
|Erick Sánchez
|Decision (unanimous)
|Bellator 250
|
|align=center|3
|align=center|5:00
|Uncasville, Connecticut, United States
| 
|-
|Win
|align=center|15–1
|Mike Hamel
|Decision (split)
|Bellator 243
|
|align=center|3
|align=center|5:00
|Uncasville, Connecticut, United States
| 
|-
|Loss
|align=center|14–1
|Darrion Caldwell
|Submission (rear-naked choke)
|Bellator 238
|
|align=center|1
|align=center|2:20
|Inglewood, California, United States
|
|-
|Win
|align=center|14–0
|Pat Curran
|TKO (punches)
|Bellator 226
|
|align=center|2
|align=center|4:59
|San Jose, California, United States
|
|-
|Win
|align=center| 13–0
|Aaron Pico
|TKO (flying knee and punches)
|Bellator 222
|
|align=center|2
|align=center|3:55
|New York City, New York, United States
|
|-
|Win
|align=center|12–0
|Josenaldo Silva
|Submission (rear-naked choke)
|Bellator 205
|
|align=center|3
|align=center|1:46
|Boise, Idaho, United States
|
|-
|Win
|align=center|11–0
|Teodor Nikolov	
|KO (flying knee)
|Bellator 196
|
|align=center| 2
|align=center|2:25
|Budapest, Hungary
|
|-
| Win
|align=center| 10–0
| Anthony Taylor	
| Submission (rear-naked choke)
| Bellator 177
| 
|align=center| 1
|align=center| 4:12
|Budapest, Hungary
|
|-
| Win
|align=center| 9–0
| Manuel Bilić
| Submission (triangle choke)
| FFC 23
| 
|align=center| 2
|align=center| 3:32
|Vienna, Austria
| 
|-
| Win
|align=center| 8–0
| Matija Blažičević	
| Decision (split)
| FFC 20
| 
|align=center| 3
|align=center| 5:00
|Zagrab, Croatia
| 
|-
| Win
|align=center| 7–0
| Benjámin Molnár
| Submission (triangle choke)
| HFC 10
| 
|align=center| 2
|align=center| 4:17
|Zalaegerszeg, Hungary
| 
|-
| Win
|align=center| 6–0
| Jaroslav Jartim	
| Submission (triangle choke)
| HFC 9
| 
|align=center| 1
|align=center| 4:14
|Győr, Hungary
| 
|-
| Win
|align=center| 5–0
| Marko Burušić	
| Decision (unanimous)
| FFC 7
| 
|align=center| 3
|align=center| 5:00
|Sarajevo, Bosnia and Herzegovina
| 
|-
| Win
|align=center| 4–0
| Benjámin Molnár
| DQ (illegal slam)
| HFC 7
| 
|align=center| 4
|align=center| 2:46
|Budapest, Hungary
| 
|-
| Win
|align=center| 3–0
| Németh Ádám	
| KO (flying knee)
| HFC 6
| 
|align=center| 2
|align=center| 3:45
|Pápa, Hungary
| 
|-
| Win
|align=center| 2–0
| Tárnai József	
| Decision (unanimous)
| HFC 6
| 
|align=center| 3
|align=center| 5:00
| Pápa, Hungary
| 
|-
| Win
|align=center| 1–0
| Hajzer Dániel
| Submission (leglock)
| HFC 5
| 
|align=center| 1
|align=center| 1:09
| Siófok, Hungary
|

See also 

 List of current Bellator fighters
 List of male mixed martial artists

References

External links 
  
  

1993 births
Living people
Hungarian male mixed martial artists
Hungarian emigrants to the United States
American male mixed martial artists
Mixed martial artists utilizing Kenpo
Mixed martial artists utilizing Muay Thai
Bellator male fighters
Hungarian Muay Thai practitioners
American Muay Thai practitioners
Hungarian male karateka
American male karateka